Bissine is a settlement and forest in Senegal. The village is in Ziguinchor Department of Ziguinchor Region in the area of Basse Casamance. In the 2002 census it had a population of 743 in 104 households.

The nearby forest of Bissine is a classified reserve.

References

External links
PEPAM

Populated places in the Ziguinchor Department